The superior mesenteric plexus is a continuation of the lower part of the celiac plexus, receiving a branch from the junction of the right vagus nerve with the plexus.

It surrounds the superior mesenteric artery, accompanies it into the mesentery, and divides into a number of secondary plexuses, which are distributed to all the parts supplied by the artery, viz., pancreatic branches to the pancreas; intestinal branches to the small intestine; and ileocolic, right colic, and middle colic branches, which supply the corresponding parts of the great intestine.

The nerves composing this plexus are white in color and firm in texture; in the upper part of the plexus close to the origin of the superior mesenteric artery is the superior mesenteric ganglion.

Additional images

See also
 Inferior mesenteric plexus

References

External links
 

Nerve plexus
Nerves of the torso